This is a list of Ice Road Truckers Season 5 episodes.

The focus of this season is split between two locations. One group drives the Dalton Highway, moving freight between Fairbanks and Deadhorse with occasional side trips to Nuiqsut and Anchorage. Meanwhile, a second group transports loads between Winnipeg, Manitoba, and several remote communities over winter and ice roads.

Returning drivers
Debogorski and Rowland return to Canada, and Yemm (seasons 1 and 2) joins them for this season to drive the ice roads in Manitoba, Debogorski for First Nations Transport, and Rowland and Yemm for Polar Industries (also hauling loads for First Nations for the first eight episodes under a contract through Polar). For Carlile, Kelly and three other truckers haul freight on the Dalton, and Hall appears in two episodes to deliver heavy loads. Kromm returns to train rookie drivers, notably Redmon and Sieber, and later advises Lane Keator to fire Redmon.

New drivers
Dave Redmon: Redmon, 45, is an Alabama native with 25 years of over-the-road trucking experience. In 2010, he, Yemm, and Kelly spent two months hauling loads on the dangerous roads in India (see IRT: Deadliest Roads, below). This season marks his first year of ice road trucking, but he is ultimately fired due to concerns about his driving performance and attitude toward other truckers (especially Tony Molesky, who abandoned Redmon at Coldfoot halfway through his first training run on the Dalton).
Tony Molesky: Molesky is a 19-year veteran of the ice roads, and like Kromm, serves as a safety and driver instructor for Carlile. In the season premiere, he describes a recent accident in which he had to swerve into a ditch to avoid a head-on collision with an oncoming rookie driver. His truck took a glancing blow, scattering debris which he later returns to pick up; by the season's end, the truck is repaired and put back in service. (He was also seen briefly in Season 3 episode 3 as Rowland's co-driver.)
Maya Sieber: Sieber is a 27-year-old resident of New York City, with three years' trucking experience on its roads. Like Redmon, this is her first year on the ice.
Vlad Pleskot: Pleskot is one of Polar's drivers. In Season 7, he and Rowland formed their own company.
Mark Kohaykewych: Mark owns Polar Industries, and drives a pilot car for an oversized load convoy Pleskot, Rowland and Yemm make to St. Theresa Point (episodes 4 and 5). Even though Mark is rarely seen at the wheel of a big rig, he is seen in the opening credits as one of the series’ stars by Season 7.

Route and destinations
 Dalton Highway: Truckers make stops at Fairbanks, Coldfoot, and Deadhorse as before. Kelly and Molesky begin a heavy haul from Anchorage via the Glenn and George Parks Highways before reaching the Dalton (episodes 6 and 7).
 Manitoba/Ontario ice roads: Truckers haul freight on the ice roads to re-supply isolated communities that have no other economical way to bring in materials. Communities serviced by the truckers during Season 5 include Oxford House, Red Sucker Lake, Bloodvein, Little Grand Rapids, St. Theresa Point, Garden Hill, Tadoule Lake and Lac Brochet and Victoria Beach in Manitoba, and Muskrat Dam in northwestern Ontario.

Final load counts
Canada
Debogorski – 22
Rowland – 21
Yemm – 20

Alaska
Kelly – 28
Redmon – 27
Molesky – 25
Sieber – 22

Episodes

The on-screen graphics for the type and weight of each load hauled featured in the first four seasons were discontinued in Season 5, now only showing the time of day or temperature depending on the situation.

References 

 

2011 American television seasons
Ice Road Truckers seasons